Vilmos Füredi (born 26 March 1947, Bernecebaráti, Hungary) is a Hungarian film director of photography and producer.

Career 
He graduated from high school in Vác in 1965. He was a cameraman at the Magyar Televízió from 1965 to 1991. From 1976 to 1979, he was part of the film photography department at the Academy of Drama and Film in Budapest. Since 1991, he has been an independent producer. In 1996, he founded the Vox Trade Media Ltd., from which he has produced from.

Personal life 
He is widowed to his wife, fellow film editor Anikó Almási (1946–2010), of which she had one child with: a daughter named Anikó (born 1986).

Filmography

Director of Photography 
 Trójai nők (1973)
 Dorottya (1973)
 Sosem lehet tudni (1974)
 Római karnevál (1974)
 Uraim, beszéljenek! (1974)
 Zenés TV színház (1974-1979)
 Tudós nők (1975)
 Sakk, Kempelen úr! (1976)
 Hullámzó vőlegény (1978)
 Sándor Mátyás (1979)
 Horváték (1981)
 Bolondok bálja (1984)
 A nap lovagjai (1989)

Producer 
 Lili (2003)
 Egri csillagok (2005)
 A két Bolyai (2006)
 Mátyás, a sosemvolt királyfi (2006)
 Illemberke (2008)
 Sweet Sixteen, a hazudós (2011)
 Vadászmese (2013)

Other films 
Hungarian versions of:
 Cover Story
 Meet John Doe
 Henrik V
 A Streetcar Named Desire
 The Contempt
 Blackie the Pirate

Awards 
 Rio de Janeiró-i fődíj (1987)
 Miskolc TV festival award (1988)
 Gyermekekért Díj (1988)

References

Sources 
 MTI ki kicsoda 2009. Hermann Péter Szerk  Budapest: Magyar Távirati Iroda. 2008.

External links 
 Filmkatalógus.hu
 Ki Kicsoda

1947 births
Hungarian film producers
Hungarian cinematographers
Living people
People from Pest County